Caroline Dolehide (born September 5, 1998) is an American professional tennis player. She achieved a career-high ranking of world No. 102 in July 2018. Her best performances on the WTA Tour came in doubles at the 2019 and the 2022 US Open events where she reached semifinals with Vania King and Storm Sanders, respectively, and also at the 2021 Wimbledon Championships. Dolehide has a career-high doubles ranking of 21, set in May 2022 and has won one WTA Tour title and 15 titles on the ITF Women's Circuit, six in singles and nine in doubles.

As a junior, Dolehide was a two-time Grand Slam finalist in doubles. She made her WTA Tour debut in July 2017, and won her first WTA title at the Monterrey Open in Mexico in March 2021. Dolehide also won her first Grand Slam match at the 2018 French Open. She has an aggressive style of play, and possesses the ability to hit powerful groundstroke winners, especially on the forehand side.

Early life and background
Dolehide grew up in the Chicago suburbs, where she began playing tennis at five years old. She has an older sister Courtney who played college tennis at UCLA, coached women's tennis at UT Austin, and became the head coach of men's and women's tennis at Georgetown in 2018. Her younger sister Stephanie also plays tennis, and has committed to West Point. Her brother Brian plays collegiate golf at Florida Atlantic University.

Dolehide worked with her youth coach Tom Lockhart since the age of six. Dolehide attended Hinsdale Central High School until her sophomore year, when she moved to Florida to train with the United States Tennis Association (USTA). At this point, she began working with Stephen Huss, a former Australian professional tennis player. Dolehide had verbally committed to play tennis at UCLA, but ultimately decided to forgo attending college to pursue a career as a professional.

Junior career
In 2014, Dolehide reached the semifinals of the girls' singles event at the US Open, despite needing to qualify for the main draw. She upset three of the top ten seeds in the tournament, including Markéta Vondroušová in the first round, before losing to the eventual champion Marie Bouzková. Later that year, she also made it to the semifinals of the Eddie Herr Championships and the quarterfinals at the Orange Bowl, two prestigious Grade 1 tournaments. This helped her rise to a career high ITF junior ranking of No. 16 in the world the following summer. Dolehide was then forced to skip the 2015 US Open and most of the remaining events that season after breaking her left foot. This injury prevented her from continuing to climb in the rankings.

As a junior, Dolehide was more successful in doubles than in singles. In April 2015, she partnered with Ena Shibahara to win the USTA International Spring Championships, her only title at a Grade 1 event. The following week, the duo made it to another final at the Easter Bowl, this time losing to Sofia Kenin and Katie Swan. In the last few tournaments of her junior career, Dolehide achieved two of her best results with two Grand Slam runner-ups, the first at the 2015 French Open with partner Katerina Stewart and the second at the 2016 US Open with partner Kayla Day.

Professional career

2016–17: First ITF titles in singles and doubles & WTA quarterfinal, top 150
Dolehide began playing regularly on the ITF Women's Circuit in 2016, after missing the second half of 2015 with a broken left foot. In June, she won both the singles and doubles events at the $10k tournament in Buffalo for her first professional titles. The following year in 2017, she then won two more tournaments at the $25k-level, including Winnipeg in July. Later that month, Dolehide qualified for the Stanford Classic to make her WTA Tour main-draw debut. She won her first WTA Tour-level match against No. 48 Naomi Osaka before losing to compatriot Madison Keys in the next round. This success helped her crack the Top 200 of the WTA rankings for the first time. 

After the US Open, Dolehide made her first WTA Tour quarterfinal at the Tournoi de Québec to rise to a career-high ranking of No. 137.

Dolehide also played in the doubles event at Stanford with her Junior US Open partner Kayla Day. The pair had already reached two finals and won one title on the ITF Circuit in February, and they continued their success together by making it to the semifinals in their doubles debut on the WTA Tour. The two of them were also awarded a wildcard into the US Open, where they upset 10th-seeded veteran doubles specialists Abigail Spears and Katarina Srebotnik in their Grand Slam debut in doubles. A few weeks later, Dolehide followed up this performance by winning a $100k title at the Abierto Tampico with veteran María Irigoyen, a victory that helped her finish the year just inside the top 100 of the WTA doubles rankings.

2018–21: Major & WTA 1000 debut in singles, US Open & Wimbledon semifinals & maiden WTA title & top 25 in doubles

In March 2018, Dolehide was awarded a wildcard into the main draw of the Indian Wells Open, where she picked up her first two match wins at a Premier Mandatory tournament, including a second round victory over No. 30 Dominika Cibulkova. She also pushed Simona Halep to three sets in her third-round loss to the world No. 1 player. Dolehide continued her momentum into the clay-court season, where she won the $60k event at Indian Harbour Beach, the biggest title of her career. 

She closed out the clay-court season by qualifying for the French Open.
In her Grand Slam main-draw debut in singles, Dolehide defeated Viktorija Golubic before losing to Keys in the following match. In the next few months, she also made her debuts at Wimbledon as a lucky loser and the US Open as a direct acceptance, but lost in the opening round in both tournaments. She also received a wildcard into the US Open doubles draw with Christina McHale and reached the third round.

Following the 2018 US Open, Dolehide did not win multiple main draw matches at a singles event again until a $25k event in April 2019 where she finished runner-up to Barbora Krejčíková. Nonetheless, she dropped out of the top 200 since she was defending points from a $60K title. Dolehide fared better in doubles in the first half of the year, reaching two $100k finals. She finished runner-up at Bonita Springs in Florida with Usue Maitane Arconada before winning a title at the Surbiton Trophy with Jennifer Brady. Dolehide continued to struggle in singles and reached a year-low of No. 283 in the singles rankings on 12 August 2019.

Dolehide's form began to rebound in a big way after she brought back two medals from the 2019 Pan American Games in Lima, Peru. The first was a gold medal in doubles, pairing with Usue Arconada to make the 20 year-old duo the first American gold medalists in women’s doubles at the Pan Am Games since Pam Shriver and Donna Faber in 1991 in Havana. The next day, Dolehide earned a second place finish in singles and added a silver medal to her haul.

Back in the States, Dolehide promptly won her first singles title of the year at the $60k Thoreau Open. She then qualified for the 2019 US Open, where she lost her only WTA match of the year to No. 18 Wang Qiang. In the doubles event, Dolehide partnered with compatriot Vania King to produce her best result of the year. The pair reached the semifinals, defeating the 14th-seeded team of Lyudmyla Kichenok and Jeļena Ostapenko, before losing to the eventual champions Elise Mertens and Aryna Sabalenka. With this performance, Dolehide rose to No. 72 in the world in doubles. Before the end of the year, Dolehide won another $60k title at the 2019 Charleston Pro to return to the top 200 of the singles rankings.

2022–23: Major singles debut at Australian Open & two doubles quarterfinals, US Open doubles semifinal
Dolehide made her singles debut at the 2022 Australian Open and the WTA 1000 2022 Guadalajara Open Akron after qualifying.
In doubles, she reached the quarterfinals at the 2022 Australian Open and the semifinals at the 2022 US Open partnering Storm Sanders.

In 2023 she reached back-to-back quarterfinals at the Australian Open partnering Anna Kalinskaya.
Ranked No. 206, she reached her second tour-level quarterfinal at the 2023 Monterrey Open as a qualifier defeating Jule Niemeier and Anna Karolína Schmiedlová and her first since Québec City in 2017. As a result she moved close to 40 positions up in the rankings.

Playing style
Dolehide is an aggressive baseliner. She is known for having a strong serve and powerful groundstrokes, which she uses to a hit a high number of winners. Her forehand in particular is one of her best shots and was already very advanced while she was still a teenager. CiCi Bellis faced Dolehide at the 2014 Orange Bowl when both players were still juniors and commented that Dolehide "hits probably the hardest by far" compared to Bellis's other opponents and said "her serve is amazing." Venus Williams defeated Dolehide at the 2018 Canadian Open, but commented that "she had a really great second serve."

Performance timelines

Only main-draw results in WTA Tour, Grand Slam tournaments, Fed Cup/Billie Jean King Cup and Olympic Games are included in win–loss records.

Singles
Current through the 2023 Australian Open.

Doubles
Current through the 2022 US Open

WTA career finals

Doubles: 4 (1 title, 3 runner-ups)

ITF finals

Singles: 9 (6 titles, 3 runner-ups)

Doubles: 13 (9 titles, 4 runner-ups)

Junior Grand Slam finals

Girls' doubles: 2 (2 runner-ups)

Notes

References

External links
 
 

1998 births
Living people
American female tennis players
People from Hinsdale, Illinois
Tennis people from Illinois
Pan American Games medalists in tennis
Pan American Games gold medalists for the United States
Pan American Games silver medalists for the United States
Tennis players at the 2019 Pan American Games
Medalists at the 2019 Pan American Games
21st-century American women